Akotom (mostly referred to as Afamase Akotom) is a small town found in Prestea Huni Valley Municipality in the Western Region of Ghana. In 2018,  an ultra-modern borehole was commissioned by Toyota Ghana Company Limited at Afamasi Akotom School.

References 

Populated places in the Western Region (Ghana)